Hazel Green High School (HGHS) is a public high school in Hazel Green, Alabama, United States. It is the oldest school in the Madison County Schools district.

History

Building 
The earliest record of a school in Hazel Green, Alabama can be traced to 1819; as of that time, the area of Hazel Green was especially agrarian. Hazel Green School, as it was known by, was a small private schoolhouse located somewhere between what is now Hazel Green Elementary and Highway 431. Students were solicited in the Alabama Republican to attend Hazel Green School for one dollar per month. After that time, records show that numerous other schools were started. All schools in the Hazel Green area were private until another school with the same name of Hazel Green School emerged in 1920. On May 8, 1916, a 1,000 dollars grant was approved and construction began on the new Hazel Green School. A two-story building was constructed; in its first year of operation, it facilitated ninety-seven students and three teachers. From there, Hazel Green School was rebuilt several times (rebuilt in 1928, 1962, and 1994 to hold more capacity.) From 1920 until fall of 1994, Hazel Green School was a unit school for grades K-12. It was not until 1994 that Hazel Green School's upper grades were formed into Hazel Green High School (grades 9–12.)
In 2010, a sixteen million-dollar renovation and addition was completed. This addition added eleven new classrooms (including two biology/chemistry labs, home economics labs and a special needs facility), a band room, a new gymnasium, and a cafetorium. The old cafetorium was remodeled into a black box theater.

Mascot 
Originally, due to the town's name, Hazel Green School was identified as the Greenies (a mythical elf-like creature.) During the 1960s,  considerations arose about the school colors in comparison to the mascot, the colors at the time being red and white. The HGS Booster Club decided that either the colors or the mascot must be replaced, so in 1965 Hazel Green School's mascot became the Trojan.

Rivalry

The Trojans hold a distinguished rivalry with cross-county school Buckhorn. The students of HGHS usually wear camouflage when playing the Bucks because of their opponents wildlife mascot. The annual football game between the two schools has become known as the “Cotton Classic”. The two also have a heated rivalry in basketball.

Notable alumni and staff 
 George Lindsey, actor

Athletic Programs  
 Football
 Baseball
 Softball
 Basketball 
 Cheerleading
 Soccer
 Volleyball 
 Wrestling
 Tennis
 Swimming
 Bowling
 Track/Cross Country
   Athletic Accomplishments

References

External links 
 

Public high schools in Alabama
Schools in Madison County, Alabama
Educational institutions established in 1920
1920 establishments in Alabama